Jean Pirro (24 December 1813 – 3 February 1886) was a French linguist who in 1868 invented the "universal language", Universalglot.  He was born in Woustviller, France. He was also the father of André Pirro.

He died on 3 February 1886 in Saint-Dizier, France.

See also
Constructed languages

Constructed language creators
1813 births
1886 deaths
French people of Italian descent